Uchithanai Muharnthaal is a 2011 Indian Tamil-language film directed by Pugazhendhi Thangaraj and assisted by Prashanth Ramamurthy. The plot revolves around a 13-year-old Sri Lankan Tamil girl, portrayed by child actress Neenika. The film also stars Sathyaraj, Seeman and Sangeetha, while featuring music scored by D. Imman. The film released on 16 December 2011, delayed from August.

Plot 
Punithavadhi is a 13-year-old Sri Lankan Tamil girl who lives with her parents in Batticaloa, Sri Lanka. The neighborhood and the surrounding more often remains a mute victim to the atrocities perpetrated on unarmed men, women and children by the heavily armed SL army troops. As it happens, tragedy strikes Punitha’s family as she becomes the latest gang rape victim by the SL soldiers. As a result, Punitha gets pregnant.

Punitha’s mother, in order to save her child from further trouble, lands up on Indian shores by illegal means. Professor Nadesan, who is under fire from the local police for offering refuge to illegal immigrants from SL, patronizes Punitha and her mother. He and his wife Nirmala take Punitha to Rekha, a doctor, for regular medical checkups.

When Natesan and Nirmala are away on some work, Punitha disappears from their house and lands up in the clutches of some local rowdies. She gets unexpected help from a transgender security guard who saves her from the custody of the rowdies and reaches her safely to Natesan’s residence. With the security guard’s help, Natesan brings the culprits to book. During the course of this case, Natesan befriends the local police inspector Charles Anthony.

The story takes a turn when Punitha is known to have HIV contracted from the gang rape. The rest of the film revolves around the struggle to save Punitha and her child. Punitha is unable to be saved in the end, though, and dies along with her father, who dies earlier in the film as a result of being shot by the SL Army, and her mother, who also dies in the film after being abducted by the SL army when looking for her husband. The end credits portray all three of them walking along the beach of Batticoloa happily.

Cast 
 Neenika as Punithavadhi
 Sathyaraj as Nadesan
 Seeman as Charles Antony
 Sangeetha as Nirmala Nadesan
 Nassar as Dr. Deivanayagam
 Lakshmi Ramakrishnan as Dr. Rekha
 Lavanya as Mrs. Charles Antony
 Aishwarya as Security Guard
 Sathik Basha as Sathik Basha (Cameo appearance)

Soundtrack 
The soundtrack was composed by D. Imman.

Reception 
Sify gave the movie a positive verdict calling it a bold film while highlighting Neenika's performance. IndiaGlitz said, "Pughazhendhi Thangaraj deserves applause for making an honest attempt without bowing to commercial pressures". The film won the Tamil Nadu State Film Award for Third Best Film.

References

External links 

2011 films
2010s Tamil-language films